Prides Crossing is a neighborhood of the city of Beverly, Massachusetts in the North Shore region. It is bordered to the east by Beverly Farms, and to the west by the Beverly Cove areas of Beverly.

History
The name is associated with John Pride  – supposedly a nephew of Thomas Pride – who was granted land in the area in 1636. In the late 1800s and early 1900s grand mansions were built as summer "cottages' for wealthy business magnates. Henry Clay Frick, who made his fortune in steel (Carnegie Steel)  was among the best known of these summer residents. He built "Eagle Rock", located between Hale Street and the Atlantic Ocean. Edward Carelton Swift, at one time the owner of the largest meat packing operation in the U.S. built a mansion, "Swiftmoor" on Paine Avenue in Prides Crossing. Eleonora "Eleo" Sears, a flamboyant female socialite and world class tennis player, owned a residence that still exists where Paine Avenue and West Beach meet. 

Wealthy residents were known to travel to Prides Crossing in their private railroad cars, disembarking at the Prides Crossing station, located on Hale Street across from the entrance gates to Paine Avenue. (Some, including Frick and Moore, had private sidings for their cars.) MBTA Commuter Rail service to the station lasted until 2020; the structure was converted to commercial use decades prior.

Notable former residents
Henry Clay Frick, steel magnate
Alice Roosevelt Longworth, writer and socialite
Richard D. Sears, tennis player
Edwin C. Swift, industrialist
Frederick Ayer, industrialist
William Henry Moore, judge and financier
Norman Prince, co-founder of the Lafayette Escadrille
Jerome Napoleon Bonaparte II, military officer
Loring family:
William Loring, Massachusetts Supreme Judicial Court justice
Katharine Peabody Loring, historian
Augustus Peabody Loring, Jr., legal writer

References

Wright, John Hardy (2000). Images of America, Beverly (Paperback ed.)Charlestown S.C. Arcadia.

External links
Beverly Farms- Prides Crossing Website
History of Beverly Farms, Primary research, Neighborhoods of Beverly

Geography of Essex County, Massachusetts
Beverly, Massachusetts